Gaurav Gambhir (born 26 November 1987) is an Indian cricketer. He made his Twenty20 debut on 11 November 2019, for Chandigarh in the 2019–20 Syed Mushtaq Ali Trophy.

References

External links
 

1987 births
Living people
Indian cricketers
Chandigarh cricketers
Place of birth missing (living people)